Peeping Tom at the Seaside was an 1897 French short silent film by Georges Méliès. It was sold by Méliès's Star Film Company and is numbered 113 in its catalogues.

The film is one of a small group of risqué "mature subjects" (i.e. stag films) Méliès made around this time; others included A Private Dinner, After the Ball, and A Hypnotist at Work. Peeping Tom at the Seaside is currently presumed lost.

References

External links
 

French black-and-white films
Films directed by Georges Méliès
French silent short films
Lost French films
1890s lost films
1897 short films
1890s French films